Herpestides is an extinct genus of terrestrial carnivore that was endemic to North Africa and Southern Europe during the Early Miocene subepoch (22.4—20 mya) and existed for approximately 2.4 million years.

Taxonomy
Herpestides is considered to belong to the Aeluroidea group of cat-like carnivores and, in particular, to the Viverridae.

Four species are recognised:
 H. aegypticus
 H. aequatorialis
 H. antiquus
 H. compactus

References

Prehistoric hyenas
Miocene carnivorans
Prehistoric mammals of Europe
Miocene mammals of Africa
Prehistoric carnivoran genera
Fossil taxa described in 1967